Worm Interface is an independent electronic and IDM record label based in London, England, founded in 1994.

Notable artists 
 Himuro Yoshiteru
 Freeform
 Tom Jenkinson (Squarepusher)
 Jake Mandell
 Gimmik
 Solar X
 Sandspider

See also 
 List of record labels
 List of electronic music record labels

External links
 Official site

Electronic music record labels
British independent record labels
Record labels established in 1994